Sucúa is a town in the Morona Santiago province of Ecuador. It is the seat of the Sucúa Canton.

The population as of a 1995 census was 5,847 and in 2009 it had an estimated population of 7,919.

Data of Sucua 
 ALTITUDE: 900 m.s.n.m.
 TEMPERATURE: between 18 and 28 C.
 CLIMATE: The canton is subject to the influence of the Amazon, tropical humid.
 EXTENSION: 1,279.22 km2
 POPULATION: 18,318 inhabitants. (9346 women - 8972 men) 2010 census
 DATE OF CANTONIZATION: December 8, 1962
 LIMITS:
 To the North: Canton Morona,
 To the South: Cantones Logroño and Santiago,
 To the East: Canton Morona,
 To the West: Province of Cañar
LANGUAGES: Spanish, Shuar

Tourist attractions 
 Río Upano
 Río tutanangoza
 Piedra del mono
 Cascadas de Arapicos
 Parque Botánico
 Petroglifos del Abuelo
 Mirador de Huambinimi
 Carnaval Culturizado
 Parque Ecuador Amazonico
 Museo de Sucua
 Tuntiak Nunkee
 Mirador de Piura
 Mirador Río Upano
 Cascadas Kintia Panki
 Cascadas del Río Umpuankas-Kumpas
 Balneario Cabañas Panki
 Las Taguas

Tourist activities 
Rafting
Sightseeing
Camping
Jungle exploration trips

Note: It is recommended to find an experienced tourist guide for any of these activities

Parties and Holidays 
 Fiesta de Cantonizacion de Sucua -December 8
 El Carnaval Culturizado (Carnival Celebration) -February
 Fiesta de Maria Auxiliadora -May 24.
 Peregrinación a la Virgen Purísima de Macas -August 4
 Fiesta de la Chonta -April/May
 Fiesta de la Yuca

Typical food 
 Ayampaco de pollo
 Caldo de gallina criolla
 Tamal de yuca
 Guayusa

Popular Restaurants
Ronco's Restaurant
Asadero Chelita Grill and Typical Food

References

External links 
  www.sucua.gob.ec (official web site)
  www.spanishlearningprogram.com (Spanish Learning Program Amazon - Sucua)
  www.visitasucua.com (Sucua Guide's)

Populated places in Morona-Santiago Province